Brave: The Search for Spirit Dancer is a 2005 action-adventure platform game developed by VIS Entertainment for the PlayStation 2. It received an enhanced port for the Xbox 360 and Wii under the name Brave: A Warrior's Tale.

Overview and Gameplay
The game is set in a world of Native American mythology. It follows a young Native American boy named Brave embarking on a journey to save his tribe. Brave needs to find Spirit Dancer, a legendary shaman who disappeared a long time ago, to save his tribe from the evil Wendigo.

The main game features diverse levels, with Brave needing to make his way to the end of each level. Brave learns a number of attacks and skills as the player progresses through the game.

Reception

Brave: The Search for Spirit Dancer received "mixed" reviews according to video game review aggregator Metacritic.

References

External links

2005 video games
Action-adventure games
PlayStation 2 games
PlayStation 2-only games
Sony Interactive Entertainment games
Lua (programming language)-scripted video games
Video games based on Native American mythology
Video games developed in the United Kingdom
3D platform games
Single-player video games
VIS Entertainment games